The Dundee City Council election took place on 5 May 2022, the same day as the 31 other Scottish local government elections. Each ward elected three or four councillors using the single transferable vote system, a form of proportional representation used since the 2007 election and according to the Local Governance (Scotland) Act 2004.

The election resulted in the SNP gaining a majority, winning 15 seats after gaining a seat from Labour in the West End. Labour came second with no seat change from the last election, the Liberal Democrats gained two seats, rounding their total up to four and the Conservatives fell to fourth place, losing two seats making Derek Scott, the group leader, the sole councillor elected to the council. The sole Alba Party councillor, Alan Ross, who defected from the SNP, failed to retain his seat.

After the election, the SNP's Bill Campbell and Kevin Cordell were appointed Lord Provost and Deputy Lord Provost on 20 May 2022.

Background

Previous election
At the previous election in 2017, the Scottish National Party (SNP) won 14 seats and as a result, was the largest party. Despite two losses, the SNP continued to govern however, they no longer held a majority after the Conservatives and Liberal Democrats made gains. Labour was the second-largest party on the council with 9 seats, the Conservatives won 3 seats, up two and the Liberal Democrats won 2 seats, up one.

Composition 
After the 2017 election, several changes in the composition of the council happened. Most were changes to the political affiliation of councillors including North East councillor Gregor Murray who resigned from the SNP in May 2019 after accusing the party of being transphobic and Lochee councillor Alan Ross who first left the SNP to become an independent before defecting to Alba in February 2022, making him the first Alba councillor in Dundee City Council. A single by-election was held which resulted in an SNP gain from Labour.

Retiring councillors
There were four councillors elected at the 2017 election which will depart ahead of the 2022 election.

Debates and hustings 
Ahead of the election, a series of debates and hustings were held throughout the campaign period. DC Thomson hosted an election debate on 21 April 2022 which was moderated by Derek Healey, the political editor of The Courier. The debate featured only leaders and representatives of the five parties on the council and an appeal for questions to be considered were featured. It was announced shortly after that the debate would be streamed on The Courier's social media pages on 25 April 2022.

A husting took place on 27 April 2022 which was organised and moderated by the Dundee Social Enterprise Network. The hustings featured representatives of the four parties on the council along with the inclusion of the Scottish Greens but not the Alba Party.

Results

Overall

Votes summary

Ward summary

|- class="unsortable" align="centre"
!rowspan=2 align="left"|Ward
! % 
!Seats
! %
!Seats
! %
!Seats
! %
!Seats
! %
!Seats
! %
!Seats
!rowspan=2|Total
|- class="unsortable" align="center"
!colspan=2 bgcolor="" |SNP
!colspan=2 bgcolor="" |Lab
!colspan=2 bgcolor=""|Conservative
!colspan=2 bgcolor="" |Lib Dem
!colspan=2 bgcolor="" |Green
!colspan=2 bgcolor="white"|Others
|-
|align="left"|Strathmartine
|bgcolor="#efe146"|45.4%
|bgcolor="#efe146"|2
|22.8%
|1
|5.9%
|0
|18.7%
|1
|3.3%
|0
|3.2%
|0
|4
|-
|align="left"|Lochee
|bgcolor="#efe146"|43.2%
|bgcolor="#efe146"|2
|35.8%
|2
|8.4%
|0
|3.1%
|0
|3.1%
|0
|5.3%
|0
|4
|-
|align="left"|West End
|31.3%
|2
|10.9%
|0
|6.7%
|0
|bgcolor="#FAA61A"|40.3%
|bgcolor="#FAA61A"|2
|9.4%
|0
|1.4%
|0
|4
|-
|align="left"|Coldside
|bgcolor="#efe146"|44.5%
|bgcolor="#efe146"|2
|31.1%
|2
|7.9%
|0
|3.1%
|0
|9.9%
|0
|3.4%
|0
|4
|-
|align="left"|Maryfield
|bgcolor="#efe146"|47.4%
|bgcolor="#efe146"|2
|22.6%
|1
|8.8%
|0
|4.7%
|0
|10.6%
|0
|5.9%
|0
|3
|-
|align="left"|North East
|bgcolor="#efe146"|56.5%
|bgcolor="#efe146"|2
|26.6%
|1
|8.3%
|0
|2.6%
|0
|3.3%
|0
|2.6%
|0
|3
|-
|align="left"|East End
|bgcolor="#efe146"|52.8%
|bgcolor="#efe146"|2
|26.0%
|1
|10.7%
|0
|2.8%
|0
|4.1%
|0
|3.7%
|0
|3
|-
|align="left"|The Ferry
|27.6%
|1
|10.0%
|1
|23.0%
|1
|bgcolor="#FAA61A"|34.7%
|bgcolor="#FAA61A"|1
|3.0%
|0
|1.7%
|0
|4
|- class="unsortable" class="sortbottom"
!align="left"| Total
!41.39%
!15
!22.03%
!9
!10.99%
!1
!16.54%
!4
!5.74%
!0
!3.29%
!0
!29
|}

Incumbents defeated

Ward results

Strathmartine

Lochee

West End

Coldside

Maryfield

North East

East End

The Ferry

Footnotes

References

Dundee
Dundee City Council elections
21st century in Dundee